, abbreviated as , is an adult Japanese visual novel developed by Unisonshift: Blossom for the PC. It was released on May 28, 2010. Kimi no Nagori wa Shizuka ni Yurete'''s story is focused around Mayuri Shirasagi, one of the heroines of Unisonshift Blossom's previous game, Flyable Heart. The game carries the tagline of "Flyable Heart If that Time".

Plot

Setting
The story of Kimi no Nagori wa Shizuka ni Yurete is set in the private , the same academy that the story of Flyable Heart is set in. Entry into the institution requires a background check as well as a difficult examination. Those that are qualified have all their expenses such as tuition and living costs written off.

Characters
Syo has recently transferred into the private Ōtoriryōran Academy.  holds the position of vice president of the student council at Ōtoriryōran Academy. Her popularity at the academy is like that of an idol. Mayuri has excellent grades and performs well in sports as well. Mayuri has three older sisters.  is Mayuri's eldest sister. As she has a weak body, she is often resting in her room.  is Mayuri's second sister.  is Mayuri's third sister. She was married but has since divorced and has now returned home.  is Mayuri's grandmother and the head of the Shirasagi family.  is Sayuri's husband. He does not hold a lot of authority in the Shirasagi household though he actually often takes on the tasks assigned by Tomoe due to his wife's weak body.

Story
The story of Kimi no Nagori wa Shizuka ni Yurete is centered on Mayuri Shirasagi, one of the heroines in Flyable Heart. The story is based on the supposition of what would happen if the events of Flyable Heart took a different turn.

DevelopmentKimi no Nagori wa Shizuka ni Yurete is Unison Shift's fourth project, after Flyable Heart. The scenario of the game was written by Tamaki Ichikawa and Bonanza Kazama. The illustrations were provided by Noizi Ito, Ayato Sasakura, and Pero. The writers, artists, and composer were all part of the Flyable Heart production team.

Release historyKimi no Nagori wa Shizuka ni Yurete was declared gold on May 8, 2010 and was released on May 28, 2010 in both limited and regular editions. A netbook featuring Mayuri Shirasagi was confirmed to be in production after over 100 participants stated in an online survey that they wanted such an item. Those that stated their interest in the survey was contacted first with orders opening up to the general public through the Faith electronics store on April 26, 2010 to May 10, 2010 although they were originally not going to take anymore orders after April 30, 2010. The netbook was priced at 64,980 yen (tax inclusive).

Music
The music of Kimi no Nagori wa Shizuka ni Yurete'' was composed by Ryō Mizutsuki. The theme song is named "solitude" and is sung by Kiyo.

References

External links
Official website 

2010 video games
Bishōjo games
Eroge
Japan-exclusive video games
Romance video games
Video games developed in Japan
Visual novels
Windows games
Windows-only games